Alexander Rose (born 1971) is an author and a historian.

Early life
Born in the United States, Rose was raised in Australia and Britain and educated at Cambridge University. He was awarded a doctorate for his thesis, Radar Strategy: The Air Dilemma and British Politics, 1932–1937.

Career
He worked as a journalist for several years, including as an editorial writer for The Daily Telegraph (UK) and the National Post (Canada). He has authored Kings in the North: The House of Percy in British History, a biography of some thirteen generations of the barons and earls of Northumberland between 1066 and 1485; Washington's Spies: The Story of America's First Spy Ring (a detailed account of George Washington's personal spies, the Culper Ring); American Rifle: A Biography, describing how America's military firearms shaped the country's history and vice versa; and Empires of the Sky: Zeppelins, Airplanes, and Two Men's Epic Duel to Rule the World concerning the competition between airplanes and zeppelins. He is a member of the United States Commission on Military History, the Society for Military History, and the Royal Historical Society, as well as a Fellow of the Royal Society of the Arts. Renamed Turn: Washington's Spies, Washington's Spies: The Story of America's First Spy Ring aired on AMC as a television series.

Rose has written for The Wall Street Journal, The New York Times, The Washington Post, the New York Observer, the CIA journal Studies in Intelligence, MHQ: The Quarterly of Military History, Invention & Technology, Intelligence & National Security, The National Interest, and the English Historical Review.

Filmography

Reviews 
Review of American Rifle at Letters on Pages

Publications

 Rose, Alexander. Washington's Spies: The Story of America's First Spy Ring. New York: Bantam Books, 2006.  
 Rose, Alexander. American Rifle: A Biography. New York: Bantam Dell, 2008.

References

External links 
Home page
Interview on Washington's Spies at the Pritzker Military Museum & Library

 

1971 births
American military historians
American male non-fiction writers
British historians
Historians of the British Isles
Historians of the United States
Living people